Ulla-Karin Rönnlund (née Thelin; born 19 February 1977) is a Swedish former football goalkeeper for Umeå IK in the Swedish Damallsvenskan. She represented Sweden at senior international level.

Club career

After suffering injuries during the 2001 season Rönnlund lost her motivation for football and decided to leave Umeå.

She retired again after the 2009 season, to concentrate on her family. As Söberg also left, Umeå IK signed Caroline Jönsson as a replacement.

International career

Rönnlund started playing for Sweden's national youth teams in 1993. At the 1995 edition of the Albena Cup, Rönnlund was pressed into service as a makeshift forward after a sickness bug swept through the Sweden under-20 squad. She scored the winning goal in the 1–0 final win over Ukraine.

Rönnlund played seven times for Sweden's national team. She made her senior international debut against Norway on 10 October 1998.

References

External links
 Player profile

Swedish women's footballers
1977 births
Living people
Sweden women's international footballers
Damallsvenskan players
Umeå IK players
Women's association football goalkeepers
1999 FIFA Women's World Cup players
People from Härnösand
Sportspeople from Västernorrland County